The Ukraine national under-19 football team also known as the Junior football team of Ukraine represents Ukraine in international football in the UEFA European Under-19 Football Championship and finals of the FIFA U-20 World Cup. 

It is formed by its head coach who is appointed and directed by the Ukrainian Association of Football, the governing body for football in Ukraine.

 Ukraine national under-18 football team, immediate reserve and formerly the main team before 2002
 Ukraine national under-20 football team, special team that is formed only for the FIFA U-20 World Cup upon successful performance of Ukraine U-19

Overview
Ukraine national under-19 football team is the second youth national football team in the country after the national under-21 football team. Previously it was known as Ukraine national under-18 football team before competitions shifted back in 1999. The team represents Ukraine at the continental championship for under-19 national teams (previously under-18). Most often a lot of its players formerly participated in continental and World competitions for national under-17 football teams. Upon a successful performance at the European championship for the under-19 teams it qualifies for the FIFA U-20 World Cup that is organized for teams of under-20.

Ukraine national under-19 football team has good traditions which it inherited from its parent Soviet national youth football team providing such players like Serhiy Scherbakov and Oleg Salenko for the Ukraine main national team.

The under-19 football team has its reserve team known as under-18 football team that also participates in preparations to the under-19 football competitions.

Until 2002 the team played as the national under-18 football team for Ukraine. Its first game it played in 1994 away against Israel losing it 0–2.

Honours
 Continental competitions (UEFA European Under-19 Championship):
 champions (1): 2009

 2005 FIFA Bronze Shoe Award: Oleksandr Aliev
 2009 UEFA Golden Player Award: Kyrylo Petrov
 2015 FIFA Golden Shoe Award: Viktor Kovalenko
 2015 FIFA Fair Play Award

Head coaches
 1999–2002 Anatoliy Kroshchenko
 2001–2002 Oleksandr Ryabokon
 2002-2002 Pavlo Yakovenko
 2003–2006 Yuriy Kalitvintsev
 2009-2009 Yuriy Kalitvintsev
 2010–2012 Oleh Kuznetsov
 2012–2013 Yuriy Moroz
 2012–2016 Oleksandr Holovko
 2015–2016 Oleh Kuznetsov
 2016–2017 Volodymyr Tsytkin
 2017      Volodymyr Yezerskyi
 2017–2018 Oleksandr Petrakov
 2019      Serhiy Nahornyak
 2021–2022 Volodymyr Yezerskyi
 20122–present Serhiy Nahornyak

Tournaments

Official
 FIFA U-20 World Cup (as under-20 team)
 UEFA European Under-19 Football Championship

Invitationals
 Valentin Granatkin Memorial (friendly in Saint Petersburg)
 Copa del Atlantico (for under-18)
 Memorial Stevan Cele Vilotic

Official tournaments
Unlike the under-21 team, the continental competitions for under-19 take place on annual basis starting from 1992.

European championship
Under-18 competitions

Under-19 competitions

FIFA U-20 World Cup

 2001: Round of 16 (led by Anatoli Kroschenko)
 2005: Round of 16 (led by Oleksiy Mykhaylychenko)
 2015: Round of 16 (led by Oleksandr Petrakov)
 2019: Champions (led by Oleksandr Petrakov)

Recent results

2018 UEFA European Under-19 Championship

Group B

1/2 finals

2019 UEFA European Under-19 Championship

Qualifying round

Elite round

2022 UEFA European Under-19 Championship

Group 6

Results and fixtures

2022

2023

Current squad 
The following players were selected for the 2023 UEFA European Under-19 Championship elit round qualification matches against Luxembourg, Denmark and Spain on 22, 25 and 28 March 2023 respectively.

Caps and goals correct as of 23 November 2022, after the match vs .

Recent call-ups
The following players have been called up for the team within the last 12 months.

Notes
PRE = Preliminary squad – replaces a member of the squad in case of injury/unavailability.

Honours
 UEFA European Under-19 Championship: 2009

See also 
 Ukraine (Senior) team
 Ukraine Under-21 team

References

External links
Uefa Under-19 website Contains full results archive

European national under-19 association football teams
Under-19
Youth football in Ukraine